Andrew Fyfe may refer to:

 Andrew Fyfe (cartoonist) (born 1966), Australian cartoonist and satirist
 Andrew Fyfe (chemist) (1792–1861), Scottish surgeon and chemist
 Andrew Fyfe the Elder (1754–1824), his father, Scottish anatomist
 Andy Fyfe (born 1913), Scottish footballer (Kilmarnock FC, Greenock Morton)
 Andy Fyfe (footballer, born 1898), Scottish footballer